Sheer Greed is the first album of the British glam rock band Girl, released in January 1980 by Jet Records. The album was published during the explosion of the new wave of British heavy metal phenomenon and its sales took advantage of the favourable attitude towards hard rock bands in the UK in that period. Sheer Greed peaked at No. 33 in the UK Albums Chart. Hollywood Tease was released as a single, and reached No. 50.

The song "Hollywood Tease" was later covered by the bands L.A. Guns (featuring Phil Lewis) and Sheer Greed (featuring Gerry and Simon Laffy). The American glam metal band Lillian Axe recorded a version of "My Number" on the album Love + War in 1989.

"Do You Love Me?" is a cover of the song from Kiss' album Destroyer of 1976.

Track listing
Side one
 "Hollywood Tease" (Phil Lewis, Phil Collen) - 2:39
 "The Things You Say" (Lewis, Gerry Laffy) - 3:53
 "Lovely Lorraine" (Lewis, Collen, G. Laffy) - 2:36
 "Strawberries" (Lewis) - 2:54
 "Little Miss Ann" (Lewis, G. Laffy) - 2:40
 "Doctor Doctor" (Lewis, Collen, G. Laffy) - 2:42

Side two
"Do You Love Me?" (Paul Stanley, Bob Ezrin, Kim Fowley) - 3:17
 "Take Me Dancing" (Lewis, Collen, G. Laffy) - 2:29
 "What's Up?" (G. Laffy, Simon Laffy) - 2:33
 "Passing Clouds" (Lewis) - 4:58
 "My Number" (Lewis, G. Laffy) - 3:52
 "Heartbreak America" (Lewis) - 2:43

Personnel

Band members
Phil Lewis - lead vocals
Phil Collen - lead guitar, backing vocals
Gerry Laffy - rhythm guitar, backing vocals
Simon Laffy - bass guitar, backing vocals
Dave Gaynor - drums, backing vocals

Production
Chris Tsangarides - producer, engineer
Nick Tauber - producer on tracks 3, 7, 10, 12
Dougie Bennet - engineer on tracks 3, 7, 10, 12

References

External links
Video for Girl's cover of Kiss's "Do You Love Me"
Video for Girl's "My Number"

Girl (band) albums
1980 debut albums
New Wave of British Heavy Metal albums
Albums produced by Chris Tsangarides
Jet Records albums